Kep municipality is a municipality in Kep province, in southern Cambodia. The municipality is subdivided into 2 sangkats and 5 kroms. In the 1998 census, the population of the district was 10,319 people in 2,000 households.

Subdivisions
Kep district has three sangkats and seven khum:

References 

Districts of Kep province